Ying Yong (born 17 November 1957) is a Chinese politician who is serving as the Prosecutor-General of the Supreme People's Procuratorate. He was formerly the Communist Party Secretary of Hubei from February 2020 to March 2022. He came to prominence beginning in 2003 in Zhejiang province, and served as the president of the provincial High Court. He served as the head of the Organization Department of the Shanghai Municipal Party Committee before he became deputy party secretary of Shanghai. He became the mayor of Shanghai in January 2017. On February 12, 2020, Ying was appointed Party secretary of Hubei, replacing Jiang Chaoliang during the COVID-19 pandemic.

Career 
Ying was born in Xianju County, Zhejiang province, near the city of Taizhou. He joined the Chinese Communist Party in April 1979. He holds law degrees from the China University of Political Science and Law and Hangzhou University. He began his career in Huangyan County, Zhejiang, working for the county industry bureau and the local police station. He then served as the mayor of the town of Chengguan. He successively worked his way up the bureaucratic hierarchy in Taizhou, heading its public security department, then its Political and Legal Affairs Commission (Zhengfawei).  He then became the police chief and Zhengfawei head of neighboring Shaoxing.

Ying was promoted to the provincial government in 1995, serving as the deputy provincial police chief, then the head of the provincial office for combating illegal drugs, and the leader of an effort to combat terrorism. In July 2003, Ying was promoted to Deputy Secretary of the Provincial Commission for Discipline Inspection, and several months later the concurrent head of the provincial Department of Supervision.
At the time, Xi Jinping was the provincial party secretary. As such, Ying has been named by political observers as a member of the "New Zhijiang Army."

In November 2006, Ying was named president of the Zhejiang Provincial High Court.   Ying became president of the Shanghai High Court in January 2008. In April 2013, Ying was named the head of the Organization Department of the Shanghai Municipal Party Committee, and a member of the municipality's Party Standing Committee. In June 2014, he was named deputy party secretary, overseeing party affairs and the municipal party school. In September 2016, he further obtained the office of vice-mayor. This was considered highly unusual, as deputy party secretaries do not usually hold deputy government positions simultaneously. The move was therefore was interpreted as grooming Ying for higher office, likely the future mayor of Shanghai. On 20 January 2017, Ying Yong was elected as mayor of Shanghai. Ying was the first mayor since Zhu Rongji to have spent the majority of his career outside of the municipality. Observers have noted that Ying is likely slated for further promotion. In 2017 he was elected a full member of the 19th Central Committee of the Chinese Communist Party.

Ying was a delegate to the 18th Party Congress, and a delegate to the 11th and 12th National People's Congress.

On February 12, 2020, Ying was appointed Party secretary of Hubei, replacing Jiang Chaoliang during the COVID-19 pandemic. On June 19, he was elected chairman of the Hubei Provincial People's Congress.

On April 20, 2022, he was made vice chairperson of the National People's Congress Constitution and Law Committee. On September 2, he was chosen as deputy procurator-general of the Supreme People's Procuratorate.

References

External links 
 

1957 births
Living people
Mayors of Shanghai
Hangzhou University alumni
Politicians from Taizhou, Zhejiang
Political office-holders in Zhejiang
Political office-holders in Shanghai
Chinese police officers
20th-century Chinese judges
21st-century Chinese judges
People's Republic of China politicians from Zhejiang
Chinese Communist Party politicians from Zhejiang
Members of the 19th Central Committee of the Chinese Communist Party
Delegates to the 12th National People's Congress
Delegates to the 11th National People's Congress